Evansville is an unincorporated community in Preston County, West Virginia, United States. Evansville lies on the Northwestern Turnpike (U.S. Route 50) along Little Sandy Creek.

Sources differ whether the community was named after Edward, Henry or Hugh Evans, all of whom were first settlers.

References 

Unincorporated communities in Preston County, West Virginia
Unincorporated communities in West Virginia
Northwestern Turnpike
Morgantown metropolitan area